Anoop Kannan is an Indian film director, producer and distributor who mainly works in Malayalam Cinema.

Early life
Kannan was born in Moovattupuzha, Ernakulam, as the elder son of Kesavan Nair and Vatsala Kumari. He has a brother, Ajeesh.

Career

Kannan started his career as an assistant director with Lal Jose in the 2002 blockbuster Meesa Madhavan. Later, he worked with Lal Jose in more than 10 movies as an associate director. 
He has also worked with acclaimed filmmaker Ranjith in the movie Kaiyoppu which starred Mammootty in the lead role. In 2012, Kannan made his directorial debut in Jawan of Vellimala, which is the debut film of Mammootty as a producer. In 2014, he directed Homely Meals. The screenplay of the film was written by Vipin Atlee, and the writer himself played the lead role in this project. Upon its release, Homely Meals received positive reviews and it emerged as a sleeper hit at the theaters. 
Kannan made his debut as a producer and distributor through his production banner Anoop Kannan Stories. One particular film that he produced, Oru Mexican Aparatha, was a surprise hit at the Mollywood box-office.

Filmography

References

Living people
Film directors from Kochi
Film producers from Kochi
Malayalam film directors
Year of birth missing (living people)